Dicopomorpha is a wasp genus in the family Mymaridae. It has ten described species to date.

References

External links

Mymaridae
Hymenoptera genera